Adolph Frederick Bechdolt (November 16, 1846 – May 6, 1938) was the head football coach for the University of North Dakota Fighting Sioux football team in 1894. He compiled a record of 2–2.

He was professor of English at the university from 1892 to 1895.

Bechdolt attended Lafayette College where he graduated in 1866.

Head coaching record

References

External links
 

1846 births
1938 deaths
Franklin & Marshall College alumni
Lafayette College alumni
North Dakota Fighting Hawks football coaches
University of North Dakota faculty
People from the Grand Duchy of Baden